Palaeopascichnus is an Ediacaran fossil comprising a series of lobes, first originating before the Gaskiers glaciation; it is plausibly a protozoan, but probably unrelated to the classical 'Ediacaran biota'.  Once thought to represent a trace fossil, it is now recognized as a body fossil and corresponds to the skeleton of an agglutinating organism.

See also
 List of Ediacaran genera

 Palaeopascichnid

References

Ediacaran life
Incertae sedis
Ediacaran Europe
Geology of Ukraine